The Shetland Women's Suffrage Association was an organisation involved in campaigning for women’s suffrage, based in Shetland.

Formation 
The association was formed in 1909. Their first meeting was held in the home of Christina Jamieson on 23 October 1909. There were 19 women and 1 man present, and the meeting was convened by Christina Jamieson

Activities 
The organisation was affiliated to the National Union of Women's Suffrage Societies. As such, their activities mirrored those of many other suffragist groups. They conveyed their message by addressing public meetings, distributing leaflets, and writing to the local press to promote the cause of women's suffrage.

In 1911, a banner, created by Stanley Cursiter, of the Orcadian Women's Suffrage Society, and Christina Jamieson was taken to London for the Suffrage Coronation Procession.

During the First World War, the society provided assistance to injured soldiers. They prepared bandages, held first aid classes, and nursing classes. The group also raised money, contributing to the Scottish Women's Hospitals by donating money for the "Lerwick Bed".

Notable members 
Christina Jamieson, secretary.

Alice Lyall Leisk, Assistant Secretary and Treasurer (daughter of Harriet Leisk).

Harriet Leisk, chair.

Anna Stout, first president

Further reading 
 King, Elspeth (1978) The Scottish Women’s Suffrage Movement. Glasgow. People’s Palace Museum 
 Leneman, Leah (1995) A Guid Cause: The Women’s Suffrage Movement in Scotland. Edinburgh. Mercat Press.
 Leneman, Leah (2000) The Scottish Suffragettes. Edinburgh. National Museums of Scotland. 190166340x
 Pedersen, Sarah (2017) The Scottish Suffragettes and the Press. London. Palgrave MacMillan. 9781137538338
 Taylor, Marsali (2010) Women's Suffrage in Shetland. lulu.com. 9781446108543

See also 
Feminism in the United Kingdom
List of suffragists and suffragettes
List of women's rights activists
List of women's rights organizations
Timeline of women's suffrage
Women's suffrage organizations

References 

Feminist organisations in the United Kingdom
Organizations established in 1909
Scottish suffragists
Women's organisations based in the United Kingdom
Suffrage organisations in the United Kingdom
Organisations based in Shetland
Politics of Shetland
20th century in Shetland